Dorsum teraii is a moth of the family Erebidae first described by Michael Fibiger in 2011. It is found in southern Nepal (it was described from Tarai).

The wingspan is about 13 mm. The head, patagia, anterior part of tegulae and the prothorax are black grey, while the rest of the thorax and tegulae are whitish beige. The forewing ground colour is whitish beige, but the terminal area is blackish grey. The basal patch of the costa and the costal part of the triangular medial area are whitish beige, outlined in black. The crosslines are obsolete, except the terminal line, which is indicated by black interveinal dots. The hindwing ground colour is light grey with an indistinct discal spot. The abdomen is whitish beige.

References

Micronoctuini
Moths described in 2011
Taxa named by Michael Fibiger